Saharanpur Junction railway station is a junction railway station on the Northern Railway network in the state of Uttar Pradesh, India. Its station code is SRE.

Gallery

References

External links

See also
 Saharanpur district

Saharanpur
Railway stations in Saharanpur district
Ambala railway division
Transport in Saharanpur